Arthur Woolcock (10 June 1887 – 29 June 1975) was an Australian cricketer. He played in three first-class matches for South Australia in 1909/10.

See also
 List of South Australian representative cricketers

References

External links
 

1887 births
1975 deaths
Australian cricketers
South Australia cricketers
Cricketers from Adelaide